Oberdan Sallustro (1915 in Asunción, Paraguay – 1972 in Buenos Aires) was an Italian-Paraguayan entrepreneur, Director General of FIAT Concord in Argentina. He was kidnapped and killed in 1972 by the Ejército Revolucionario del Pueblo (ERP) guerrilla group, according to newspaper reports.

Biography

Oberdan Sallustro had been kidnapped on March 21, 1972, by a six-man, one-woman commando unit of the ERP. The guerrillas shot and killed him on April 10, 1972, after the place where they had hidden him had been discovered. Both the kidnapping and the murder caused an enormous impact in the country itself and internationally.

Oberdan Sallustro in the culture 
In popular culture, the Fiat 133, Fiat 673 and Fiat 130 AU (bus) were nicknamed "Sallustro" or "Vendetta de Sallustro".
As it is understood, it is because they did not come out with the expected quality, in a kind of "rematch" for the violent death of Oberdan Sallustro.

A few years after Sallustro's assassination, Fiat Argentina paid homage to him by naming its new development, the Fiat 673 truck, with his name. This truck had severe deficiencies in its engine, (a version of the OM CP3) which mainly tended to overheat. Quickly, Argentine truck drivers and mechanics baptized it "Sallustro's Revenge". Since then, any Fiat or IVECO model that presents a problem or mechanical defect is nicknamed that way.

Awards
In 1967 he was unanimously awarded the Gold Medal of the Italian Institute for International Relations. 
In 1968 he was decorated by Pope Paul VI with the Pontifical Order of Saint Gregory the Great.

Works
Conflicts of citizenship and dual citizenship, Dante Alighieri Association, Buenos Aires, 1960.

See also
List of kidnappings
List of solved missing person cases

References

Books
Carnovale, Vera (2007). The executions of the PRT–ERP. Armed struggle in Argentina. year 3 (8): 4.
History of Peronism. The violence (1956–1983) pp. 243–244. Buenos Aires. Javier VergaraEditor. 2008. ISBB 978-950-15-2433-8.

External Links
  Informe sobre los derechos humanos en la Argentina, Comisión Interamericana de Derechos Humanos, 1980

1915 births
1972 deaths
20th-century Argentine businesspeople
Argentine murder victims
Argentine people of Italian descent
Deaths by firearm in Argentina
Formerly missing people
Kidnapped Argentine people
Kidnappings in Argentina
Male murder victims
Missing person cases in Argentina
Paraguayan emigrants to Argentina
Paraguayan people of Italian descent
People from Asunción
People murdered in Argentina